The Translator is Sudanese writer Leila Aboulela's first novel, published in 1999. It is a story about a young Muslim Sudanese widow living in Scotland without her son, and her blooming relationship with a secular Scottish Middle Eastern scholar. The novel takes place both in Khartoum and Aberdeen and was inspired partially by Aboulela's own experience moving between these two cities. Aboulela refers to the novel and the main character Sammar as "a Muslim Jane Eyre". It focuses on issues of faith, cross-cultural romance, and the modernization of Sudan.

Author J.M. Coetzee called the book "a story of love and faith all the more moving for the restraint with which it is written."

In reference to the importance of faith in the story, Riffat Yusuf of The Muslim News has called The Translator "The first halal novel written in English".

Plot 
After losing her husband, Sammar, a young Sudanese widow living in Aberdeen, struggles to cope. Desperate to go home to her family, she becomes increasingly depressed until she develops a closer friendship with Rae, the head of the department, where she works as an Arabic translator at the University of Aberdeen. The friendship soon progresses into a romance, but their love encounters cultural and religious barriers and the two have to compromise to make their relationship work.

References

1999 novels
Sudanese English-language novels
Novels set in Scotland
Aberdeen in fiction
Novels set in Sudan
Khartoum in fiction
Works about translation
1999 debut novels